The 2012 Chicago Fire season was the club's 17th year of existence, as well as their 15th season in Major League Soccer and their 15th consecutive year in the top-flight of American soccer.

The Fire began the regular season with a 1–1 tie on March 17, 2012 when they were hosted by the expansion team Montreal Impact in their first Major League Soccer home game.  The Men in Red concluded the regular season hosting D.C. United at the Toyota Park on October 27, 2012.

The Fire qualified for the MLS Cup Playoffs for the twelfth time in their fifteen competitive seasons and for the first time since 2009.  The team was eliminated from the playoffs after a 1–2 home loss to Houston Dynamo in the Knockout Round match on October 31, 2012.

At the end of the season, Chicago Fire's defender, Austin Berry, has been awarded the 2012 MLS Rookie of the Year Award, while the club's captain Logan Pause has won the 2012 MLS Fair Play Award.

Squad at the end of the season 
As of October 31, 2012. Source: Chicago Fire Official Roster

Player movement

Transfers

In

Out 

 The following players selected by Chicago Fire in either the 2012 MLS SuperDraft or 2012 MLS Supplemental Draft were released during the pre-season trials: FW Evans Frimpong, Supplemental Draft round 1; GK Karl Woszczynski, Supplemental Draft round 1; MF Justin Chavez, Supplemental Draft round 4. FW Lucky Mkosana, SuperDraft round 2, entered the season but ultimately was not signed by the club.

Loans

In

Out

Club staff

Standings 
Eastern Conference Table

Western Conference Table

Overall table

Results summary

Results by round

Match results

Pre-season 
Kickoff times are in CST.

Major League Soccer 

Kickoff times are in CDT.

MLS Cup Playoffs 

Kickoff times are in CDT.

U.S. Open Cup 

Kickoff times are in CDT.

International friendlies 
Kickoff times are in CDT.

Recognition

Kits

Leading scorers

Updated to match played on October 27, 2012.Source: MLSsoccer.com statistics - 2012 Chicago Fire

MLS Team of the Week

MLS Player of the Week

MLS Save of the Week

MLS Goal of the Week

MLS Fair Play Award 
Chicago Fire's midfielder and captain, Logan Pause, has been awarded the league's 2012 Fair Play Award.  Over the course of 32 matches played this season, Pause has accumulated only 11 fouls and no yellow or red cards.

MLS Rookie of the Year 
Chicago Fire's defender Austin Berry, selected number nine overall in the 2012 MLS SuperDraft, has been awarded the league's 2012 Rookie of the Year Award.  Berry has started in 28 games and scored three goals, one in his debut match.  Berry collected the most votes in all three categories: players, media and club management.

Miscellany

Allocation ranking 
Chicago is in the #9 position in the MLS Allocation Ranking. The allocation ranking is the mechanism used to determine which MLS club has first priority to acquire a U.S. National Team player who signs with MLS after playing abroad, or a former MLS player who returns to the league after having gone to a club abroad for a transfer fee. A ranking can be traded, provided that part of the compensation received in return is another club's ranking.

International roster slots 
Chicago has 8 MLS International Roster Slots for use in the 2012 season. Each club in Major League Soccer is allocated 8 international roster spots. No slot trades involving Chicago have been reported.

Future draft pick trades 
Future picks acquired: *2014 MLS SuperDraft round 4 pick from Real Salt Lake.
Future picks traded: *2013 MLS Supplemental Draft round 1 pick to Vancouver Whitecaps FC. At the time of the trade, this pick was equivalent to a round 3 SuperDraft selection.

MLS rights to other players 
It is believed Chicago maintains the MLS rights to Carlos Bocanegra and Freddie Ljungberg, as each of these players declined contract offers by the club and signed overseas on free transfers.

References 

Chicago Fire FC seasons
Chicago Fire Soccer Club
Chicago Fire Soccer Club
Chicago Fire